The 1906 Nebraska gubernatorial election was held on November 6, 1906.

Incumbent Republican Governor John H. Mickey did not stand for re-election.

Republican nominee George L. Sheldon defeated Democratic and Populist fusion nominee Ashton C. Shallenberger with 51.27% of the vote.

General election

Candidates
Major party candidates
Ashton C. Shallenberger, Democratic and People's Independent fusion candidate, former U.S. Congressman
George L. Sheldon, Republican, incumbent State Senator

Other candidates
Harry T. Sutton, Prohibition, head of the Department of Eloquence at Cotner College
Elisha Taylor, Socialist

Results

References

1906
Nebraska
Gubernatorial